Dave Cousins (born April 16, 1977) is an American compound archer and former number one ranked compound archer in the world.

Career
He held the FITA 720 world record with a score of 712 until it was broken by Canadian Dietmar Trillus. Dietmar's record stood at 713 until it was beaten by Liam Grimwood in July 2011. 

He has shot the most 1400 gents fitas recorded in history by one archer. He has competed several times at International Archery Federation (FITA) world championships in the men's compound division. 

He finished 2nd in 2003 at the 42nd World Outdoor Target Championship, 18th in 2005 at the 43rd World Outdoor Target Archery Championships, 9th at the 9th Indoor Archery World Championship in 2007, and 33rd at the Archery World Championships in 2009.

In 2010, he won the world field championships held in Visegrád, Hungary. He was last ranked number 1 in the world by FITA on June 20, 2005.

References

External links
 

American male archers
1977 births
Living people
World Archery Championships medalists
Competitors at the 2001 World Games
World Games gold medalists
20th-century American people
21st-century American people